Émile Bertin was a French fast light cruiser named after Louis-Émile Bertin, a 19th-century naval architect. She was designed to operate both as a minelayer and as a destroyer flotilla leader. The design was the basis for later light and heavy French cruisers, particularly the slightly larger  of cruisers. This was the first French warship to use triple mountings for guns.

Design and description
Her hull was divided by 13 bulkheads into 14 watertight compartments. Her crew consisted of 543 men in peacetime and 675 in wartime; she carried an additional 24 men when serving as a flagship.

Service history

World War II
At the start of 1939, she was transferred to Toulon.

In secrecy, she arrived in Lebanon on 23 September 1939, loaded with 57 tons of gold - the Polish state gold reserves - and returned to Toulon. At the start of 1940, after a refit at Toulon, she carried out surveillance around the Canary Islands to ensure that there were no German forces there.

After further dockyard work at Brest, in early April 1940, she became the flagship of Group Z, the French squadron supporting the Allied Norwegian campaign, with Admiral Edmond Derrien in command. Off Namsos, she was attacked by the Luftwaffe and damaged by bombs on 19 April. She returned to Brest for repair and remained there until 21 May, and was replaced off Norway, by the cruiser .

She made two trips from Brest to Halifax, Nova Scotia, the first with the cruiser  and aircraft carrier , carrying gold from the Bank of France. The French armistice was signed shortly after Émile Bertin had docked for the second time, and when Captain Battet signalled the French Admiralty for advice, the cruiser was ordered to Fort-de-France, Martinique with the gold. No effort by Royal Navy units present succeeded in preventing this, but the ocean liner , which was to follow Émile Bertin, did not succeed in leaving Halifax fast enough. She was seized and used as a troopship, operating under British colours.

Once at Martinique and the gold safely unloaded, she made ready to defend the island against an expected British attack - which was abandoned through United States pressure. For the next two years or so, the ship was inactive at anchor off Fort-de-France, until, on 16 May 1942 she was ordered by the Vichy authorities to be immobilised, after pressure from the United States.

She joined the Allied forces in June 1943, under French colours, and was modernised in the Philadelphia Naval Shipyard. Émile Bertin later operated in the Mediterranean, took part in the Allied invasion of southern France (Operation Dragoon) in 1944 and later bombarded Axis positions along the Italian Riviera.

Post-war career
After various Mediterranean duties, the cruiser entered Toulon for a refit until October 1945. She then deployed as flagship to Indochina until 2 July 1946, when she sailed for home with the cruiser . Émile Bertin then served as a gunnery training ship until the navy finally scrapped her in October 1959.

References

Bibliography

Further reading
David Miller (2001) The Illustrated Directory of Warships: From 1860 to the Present, Salamander Books, pp 214–215
Jean Lassaque (2004) Le croiseur Emile Bertin 1933-1959, Marines éditions, 

World War II cruisers of France
Ships of the Free French Naval Forces
1933 ships